Scott William Donaldson is a Former Judge of the Alabama Court of Civil Appeals.

Education

Donaldson received his Bachelor of Arts degree in commerce and business administration from the University of Alabama in 1981, and he received his Juris Doctor from the Cumberland School of Law, graduating cum laude in 1984.

Legal career
Prior to his appointment to the Court of Civil Appeals, Donaldson served as a judge from 2003 to 2013 on Alabama's sixth judicial circuit court. He was elected to a full six-year term in 2004 and was re-elected in 2010.  He also spent 18 years in private practice.

Alabama Supreme Court consideration
In 2011 Donaldson considered running for a seat on the Alabama Supreme Court but ultimately dropped out due to financial reasons.

Service on Alabama Court of Civil Appeals
On January 15, 2013 Governor Robert Bentley appointed Donaldson to the Alabama Court of Civil Appeals.

Teaching
He is a faculty member at the National Judicial College where he has taught several advanced evidence courses to judges throughout the country, and has taught courses for judicial associations in several states. He also is an adjunct professor for the University of Alabama School of Law.

Personal life
Donaldson is a registered Republican.

References

External links
Official Biography on Alabama Judicial System

Living people
Year of birth missing (living people)
Place of birth missing (living people)
Alabama state court judges
Alabama lawyers
Alabama Republicans
Cumberland School of Law alumni
University of Alabama alumni
21st-century American judges